Toni Trucks is an American actress. Best known as Lisa Davis on ‘’SEAL Team’’(2017-)

Career
Trucks studied Musical Theatre at the University of Michigan School of Music, Theatre & Dance. Upon graduation, she moved to New York where she performed regionally before relocating to Los Angeles to make her television debut as the female lead on Showtime's comedy series Barbershop. Her other television credits include Hostages, The Soul Man, House, All of Us, Veronica Mars, 'Til Death, Brothers, CSI: NY and the telefilms Star Runners and Starstruck. She has made multiple guest appearances on NCIS: New Orleans and Grimm.

Her previous film credits include Dreamgirls, Weapons, The Twilight Saga: Breaking Dawn – Part 2 and Music and Lyrics.

Trucks is currently a series regular on CBS's military drama series SEAL Team. She plays Lisa Davis, a US Navy Petty Officer Logistics Specialist responsible for making the arrangements to get the team and their gear where they need to be. She went to OCS and was commissioned as an ensign and assigned back to the SEAL team as their new intelligence officer. Trucks was also a series regular in the CBS legal drama, Made in Jersey, about a working-class woman named Marina (Janet Montgomery) who uses her street smarts to compete with her more polished colleagues at a top New York law firm. Trucks played Cyndi Vega, Marina's lively secretary and "comradette" in arms. She also guest starred in the pilot of NBC's mid-season thriller Do No Harm.

Her theater credits include By the Way, Meet Vera Stark, Cactus Flower, Stormy Weather, Kiss Me, Kate, West Side Story, Oklahoma!, Follies, Footloose, Two Gentlemen of Verona, Ragtime, Sweet Charity, and Children of Eden. Trucks studied theatre abroad at London's Marymount College and has over 17 years of dance training including ballet, modern, and tap.

Trucks co-starred in the 2012 Fox Searchlight film Ruby Sparks. The film starred Paul Dano, Zoe Kazan, and was directed by Jonathan Dayton and Valerie Faris (Little Miss Sunshine). She is also featured in the final installment of the blockbuster hit series Breaking Dawn as Mary, a member of the American Nomadic Vampire coven.

Personal life
In January 2022, Trucks announced she was expecting a baby boy with her partner Brandon Phillips.

Filmography

Film/Movie

Television

References

External links

 
 

21st-century American actresses
African-American actresses
American film actresses
American television actresses
Living people
University of Michigan School of Music, Theatre & Dance alumni
21st-century African-American women
21st-century African-American people
20th-century African-American people
20th-century African-American women
1980 births